David Kazhdan, born Dmitry Aleksandrovich Kazhdan, is a Soviet and Israeli mathematician known for work in representation theory. Kazhdan is a 1990 MacArthur Fellow.

Biography
Kazhdan was born on 20 June 1946 in Moscow, USSR.  His father is Alexander Kazhdan. He earned a doctorate under Alexandre Kirillov in 1969 and was a member of Israel Gelfand's school of mathematics. He is Jewish, and emigrated from the Soviet Union to take a position at Harvard University in 1975.  He changed his name from Dmitri Aleksandrovich to David and became an Orthodox Jew around that time.

In 2002, he immigrated to Israel and is now a professor at the Hebrew University of Jerusalem as well as a professor emeritus at Harvard.

On October 6, 2013, Kazhdan was critically injured in a car accident while riding a bicycle in Jerusalem.

Kazhdan has four children.  His son, Eli Kazhdan, was general director of Natan Sharansky's Yisrael BaAliyah political party (now merged with Likud).

Research
He is known for collaboration with Israel Gelfand, Victor Kac, George Lusztig (on the Kazhdan–Lusztig conjecture on Verma modules), with Grigory Margulis (Kazhdan–Margulis theorem), with Yuval Flicker and S. J. Patterson on the representations of metaplectic groups. Kazhdan's property (T) is widely used in representation theory.

Kazhdan held a MacArthur Fellowship from 1990 to 1995.  He was the doctoral advisor of Vladimir Voevodsky, a recipient of the Fields Medal, one of the highest awards in mathematics. Kazhdan has been a member of United States National Academy of Sciences since 1990,  of the Israel Academy of Sciences since 2006, and of the American Academy of Arts and Sciences since 2008.  In 2012, he was awarded the Israel Prize, the country's  highest academic honor, for mathematics and computer science. In 2020 he received the Shaw Prize in Mathematics.

Selected publications
 Quantum fields and strings: a course for mathematicians. Vol. 1, 2. Material from the Special Year on Quantum Field Theory held at the Institute for Advanced Study, Princeton, NJ, 1996–1997. Edited by Pierre Deligne, Pavel Etingof, Daniel S. Freed, Lisa C. Jeffrey, David Kazhdan, John W. Morgan, David R. Morrison and Edward Witten. American Mathematical Society, Providence, RI; Institute for Advanced Study (IAS), Princeton, NJ, 1999. Vol. 1: xxii+723 pp.; Vol. 2: pp. i--xxiv and 727–1501. , 81-06 (81T30 81Txx)

References

 American Academy of Arts and Sciences, Class of 2008

External links
 Official Harvard home page 
 Official Hebrew University home page
 

Members of the United States National Academy of Sciences
Members of the Israel Academy of Sciences and Humanities
Israeli mathematicians
21st-century American mathematicians
Russian mathematicians
Soviet mathematicians
Israeli Orthodox Jews
Baalei teshuva
Kazhdan, David
MacArthur Fellows
Living people
Academic staff of the Hebrew University of Jerusalem
Harvard University faculty
Soviet emigrants to the United States
1946 births
Israel Prize in computer sciences recipients